An aspis was the heavy wooden shield used by the infantry in various periods of ancient Greece.

Aspis may also refer to:

Snakes
Asp (reptile), any of several venomous snake species, known as "aspis" in antiquity
Vipera aspis, a species of venomous viper
Aspis cerastes, a synonym for Cerastes cerastes, a venomous viper
Aspis vipera, a synonym for Cerastes vipera, a venomous viper

Ships
 Greek ship Aspis, the name of two destroyers of the Hellenic Navy
 , a Greek cargo ship in service 1960–63

Places
Aspis Island, Antarctica
Aspis (Punic), a Carthaginian town at present-day Kelibia, Tunisia
Siege of Aspis, 255 BC

Other uses
Aspis (Menander), a comedy by Menander
Aspis (Dungeons & Dragons), a creature in Dungeons & Dragons
Laura Aspis Prize (or Aspis Prize or Aspis Award), a former award in the game of chess
T Bank, formerly Aspis Bank, a former commercial bank in Greece

See also
Apsis, point of least or greatest distance of a body in an elliptic orbit
Athos-Aspis, a commune in the Pyrénées-Atlantiques department, France